Louis St. Louis (May 26, 1942 – March 26, 2021) was an American songwriter, music arranger and singer, famous for songs written for Grease, particularly the song "Sandy" (co-written with Screamin' Scott Simon), which was a hit in the United Kingdom, peaking at number 2 on the UK Singles chart, and for John Travolta and performing "Rock 'n' Roll Party Queen" and "Mooning" (songs originally from the musical, where they were sung by a character named Roger that was cut from the film) with Cindy Bullens on the soundtrack.

St. Louis was born in Detroit, Michigan, on May 26, 1942. He died March 26, 2021, at the Actors Fund Home in Englewood, New Jersey.

Works
 Soon (1971) – vocal arrangements/music director
 Over Here! (1974) – vocal and dance arrangements/music director
 The Wild Party (1975) – additional music for Nadine's dance
 Truckload (1975) – composer
 Grease (1978) – creative music consultant and music adapter
 Composer "Sandy"
 Performer: "Mooning" and "Rock 'n' Roll Party Queen"
 The Fan (1981) – additional show songs
 Grease 2 (1982) – composer
 All the Right Moves (1983) – composer (song "Hold Me Close To You")
 Ironweed (1987) – as Piano Man
 Smokey Joe's Cafe (1995) – composer, arranged songs, conductor
 Jesus Christ Superstar (2008 production) – arranger
 Joker's Game (2011 China production) – composer, music director

References

External links
 
 

1942 births
2021 deaths
People from Detroit
American male composers
21st-century American composers
21st-century American male musicians